Jassa Singh Ahluwalia (born 12 September 1990) is a British actor, director and radio presenter.  He acted in the BBC television series Some Girls, the film The Whale and presented the Disney Junior TV show Art Attack.

Early life 
Ahluwalia was born in Coventry, England. He is of British and Indian descent, and speaks fluent Punjabi. 

His grandfather was the architect James A Roberts.

Ahluwalia grew up in Oadby, Leicester, where he attended first Launde Primary School, and later Beauchamp College, where he achieved 10 A* grades at GCSE and straight As at A Level (at a time when an A* grade was not available at A level). While at school, he had a number of small roles, including a speaking role in the film My Angel. Aged 19, he attained a place on the Prime Minister's Global Fellowship programme, spending six weeks in China. He later attended University College London for one year, studying Spanish and Russian, before dropping out to pursue a television career.

Career 
In 2010, Ahluwalia got his big break when he successfully auditioned for the role of host in the children's television series Art Attack. He presented the show for one series in 2011, filming in Argentina, before being replaced by Lloyd Warbey.

In 2011, Ahluwalia begun work on his first titled All Your Letters.

Ahluwalia's next big break was securing the recurring part of lovable badboy Rocky in BBC Three's Some Girls. He plays the love interest of the main character Viva (Adelayo Adedayo). The first season aired in 2012, with the second season being aired in 2013. He also features in the show's third series, which aired in late 2014. He has to date featured in eight episodes.

A role in BBC One's Casualty was next, as he performed in an episode entitled "Seeing in the Dark", which aired on 27 October 2012. Ahluwalia had a small part in The Bible, where he played young David, slayer of Goliath. Filmed in Morocco, this miniseries screened on the History Channel in 2013.

Perhaps his best received performance to date was an appearance in the BBC drama Ripper Street, where he played Vincent Featherwell, a gay prostitute posing as a telegraph boy, in the episode "Threads of Silk and Gold", which was the fifth episode of the second series.

Ahluwalia featured again on BBC One in December 2013, in the film The Whale which tells the true story of the sinking of the whaleship Essex. He plays Owen Coffin, one of the sailors and a cousin of the ship's captain, George Pollard, Jr.

In 2013, he produced a short film entitled Modern Man with director Sebastian Solberg. The film tells the story of an accidental time-travelling cave-woman and her chance encounter with Rupert on the day he plans to propose to his girlfriend.

He has also filmed film for NBC Universal, which has not yet been released.

He has presented programmes on the BBC Asian Network.

Filmography

References

External links

1990 births
Alumni of University College London
Living people
People from Leicester
British male actors of Indian descent
BBC Asian Network presenters
Ahluwalia